The 2015–16 Czech First League, known as the Synot liga for sponsorship reasons, was the 23rd season of the Czech Republic's top-tier football league. Defending champions Viktoria Plzeň won the league for a second consecutive season, winning their fourth Czech title as a result.

Teams
Sigma Olomouc, the 2014–15 FNL champion, returned to the First League just one season after their relegation. Runner-up FK Varnsdorf were not promoted as their stadium failed to meet the league requirements. Instead, FC Fastav Zlín rejoined the top level for the first time since the 2008–09 season.

Stadia and locations

Personnel and kits

League table

Results

Top scorers

Attendances

See also
 2015–16 Czech Cup
 2015–16 Czech National Football League

References

External links
  

2015–16 in European association football leagues
1
2015-16